Clive Beddoe (born 26 May 1946) is a founding shareholder and former chairman of the board of directors of WestJet, which is currently the second-largest airline in Canada behind Air Canada.

Beddoe was born in Dorking, England, grew up in Leatherhead, England, and immigrated to Canada in 1970.

Beddoe first started flying gliders at Epsom College in England during his teenage years. While talking to a friend one day, he decided to move to Canada on a whim to start a job at a real estate development company, further on creating his own commercial development company called Hanover Management, a named based on Hanover Square, London a location where he once worked. He also owns Western Concord Manufacturing, a plastic manufacturing company based out of Delta, British Columbia.

In 2000, WestJet's founders, Beddoe, Mark Hill, Tim Morgan and Donald Bell were honored as 'The Ernst & Young Entrepreneur of the Year' for Canada and was honored at the international Entrepreneur of the year awards in Monaco.

He has been awarded honorary degrees from the University of Calgary and the Wilfrid Laurier University.

On Tuesday, 24 July 2007, Beddoe announced that effective 4 September 2007, he would relinquish his duties as chief executive officer, with then-president Sean Durfy taking the role. 

He is currently on the board for AIMCO, and head of their compensation committee.

Awards and honours
Beddoe was inducted to the Order of the Canadian Business Hall of Fame in 2012. Beddoe was also inducted into Canada's Aviation Hall of Fame in 2014.

A WestJet Boeing 787-8 Dreamliner registered C-GUDH has been named after him.

References

External links
 Biography at WestJet website

1946 births
Living people
Canadian people of English descent
Canadian chairpersons of corporations
Canadian airline chief executives
Businesspeople from Calgary
WestJet people
People educated at Epsom College
People from Dorking
Canadian Aviation Hall of Fame inductees